Sima You (246 – 27 April 283), courtesy name Dayou, was an imperial prince of the Western Jin dynasty of China. He was the second son of Sima Zhao, a regent of the Cao Wei state during the Three Kingdoms period, and Zhao's wife Wang Yuanji. 

Sima You became the heir to his uncle, Sima Shi, who eventually died without any sons. It is known that Sima You was a person of mild-mannered character, who was expected to become King of Jin, but ended up being passed over due to his young age. The heir that was eventually chosen was Sima Zhao's first son, Sima Yan (Emperor Wu), who usurped the Cao Wei throne and established the Jin dynasty with himself as the new emperor in February 266. Sima You was made Prince of Qi on 9 February 266.

When Emperor Wu appointed his developmentally disabled son heir apparent, he was concerned that his subjects viewed Sima You too favourably. In order to strengthen his son's position, he ordered Sima You away from Luoyang in 282 to his fiefdom of Qi, despite protestations from their sisters, Princess Jingzhao and Princess Changshan. Sima You fell ill from the stress and died soon after at the age of 36 (by East Asian age reckoning).

Sima You's son, Sima Jiong, was one of the eight princes involved in the War of the Eight Princes during the reign of Emperor Hui, the second emperor of the Jin dynasty.

References

 Chen, Shou. Records of the Three Kingdoms (Sanguozhi).
 Fang, Xuanling. Book of Jin (Jin Shu).
 Pei, Songzhi. Annotations to Records of the Three Kingdoms (Sanguozhi zhu).
 Sima, Guang. Zizhi Tongjian.

248 births
283 deaths
Cao Wei politicians
Jin dynasty (266–420) imperial princes
Jin dynasty (266–420) politicians